Lie Down in the Light is a studio album by Will Oldham. It was released under the moniker Bonnie "Prince" Billy on Drag City in 2008.

Track listing

Personnel
Musicians
 Will Oldham – music
 Emmett Kelly – guitar, harmony voice, recorder, shrooti box
 Shahzad Ismaily – percussion, banjo, piano, electric guitar, row of wrenches, laptop organ
 Paul Oldham – bass guitar
 Ashley Webber – voice
 Roy Agee – trombone
 Tony Crow – piano, organ
 Glen Duncan – fiddle
 Pete Finney – pedal steel guitar
 Ben Martin – percussion
 Dennis Solee – clarinet
 Rod Fletcher – voices
 John Ryles – voices
 Marty Slayton – voices

Production
 Mark Nevers – recording
 Paul Oldham – mixing (5)
 Scott Colburn – mastering
 Joanne Oldham – cover drawing, depicting Jacob Wrestling with the Angel

Charts

References

External links
 

2008 albums
Will Oldham albums
Drag City (record label) albums
Domino Recording Company albums